Second Childhood is the second album by the singer and songwriter Phoebe Snow, released in 1976. Second Childhood was certified gold by the RIAA on July 9, 1976.

Reception

In a retrospective review for AllMusic, critic William Ruhlmann called the album "a classy job on which Snow contributed seven originals and displayed her versatility on covers ranging from Motown to Gershwin." Robert Christgau wrote of the album: "I'm pleased to report that her trademark melismatic quaver hasn't degenerated into a gimmick, and I acknowledge that this is a good record of its type. I just have my doubts about how good a jazz-folk mood-music record can be."

Track listing
All songs by Phoebe Snow, except where noted

"Two Fisted Love" - 4:03
"Cash In" - 5:44
"Inspired Insanity" - 3:56
"No Regrets" (Harry Tobias, Roy Ingraham) - 2:58
"Sweet Disposition" - 4:04
"All Over" - 3:29
"Isn't It a Shame" - 3:56
"Going Down for the Third Time" (Holland–Dozier–Holland) - 2:33
"Pre-Dawn Imagination" - 3:28
"There's a Boat Dat's Leavin' Soon for New York" (George Gershwin, Ira Gershwin, DuBose Heyward) - 5:27

Personnel 
 Phoebe Snow – lead vocals, backing vocals (1, 2, 5, 6, 8), acoustic guitar (1, 2, 3, 7)
 Ken Ascher – electric piano (1)
 Ken Bichel – synthesizers (1)
 Richard Tee – electric piano (2, 5), acoustic piano (8), organ (8)
 Don Grolnick – electric piano (4, 6, 10), acoustic piano (9)
 Hugh McCracken – acoustic guitar (1), electric guitar (2, 5, 8)
 John Tropea – electric guitar (1, 8)
 Stuart Scharf – acoustic guitar (7)
 Tony Levin – bass guitar (1, 2, 8)
 Ron Carter – double bass (3)
 Will Lee – bass guitar (4, 6, 9, 10)
 Gordon Edwards – bass guitar (5)
 Richard Davis – double bass (7)
 Steve Gadd – drums (1, 2)
 Grady Tate – drums (5, 8, 10)
 Jimmy Young – drums (4, 6) 
 Ralph MacDonald – percussion (2, 3, 6, 7)
 David Sanborn – saxophone solo (1, 5)
 Jerome Richardson – flute solo (10)
 Patrick Williams – orchestration (2, 3, 6, 9, 10)
 Howard Johnson – tuba quintet arrangement (5)
 Phil Kearns – backing vocals (1, 5, 6, 8)
 The Jessy Dixon Singers – backing vocals (2)
 Phil Ramone – backing vocals (5)

Production 
 Producer – Phil Ramone
 Engineers – Glenn Berger and Phil Ramone
 Assistant Engineers – Vicky Fabry and David Smith
 Design – Ed Lee
 Photography – Frank Laffitte
 Handwriting – Robert Biro and Andy Engel

Charts

Certifications

References

Phoebe Snow albums
1976 albums
Albums produced by Phil Ramone
Columbia Records albums